Glyphostoma candida is a species of sea snail, a marine gastropod mollusk in the family Clathurellidae.

Description
The size of an adult shell varies between 10 mm and 14 mm. The ribs are rather broad and rounded. The revolving striae are only white at the base.

Distribution
This species occurs in the Pacific Ocean along Panama.

References

External links
 

candida
Gastropods described in 1843